Marche was a constituency used to elect a single member of the Belgian Chamber of Representatives between 1831 and 1900.

Representatives

References

Defunct constituencies of the Chamber of Representatives (Belgium)